Burnside is a small townsite located in the South West region of Western Australia in the Shire of Augusta-Margaret River. In 2021, the new locality of Yebble was created from non-residential parts of Burnside and Gracetown.

References 

Towns in Western Australia
South West (Western Australia)